Digital Population is an EP released by The Most Serene Republic on Arts & Crafts. It contains 5 tracks from Population that were remixed as 16 Bit versions. It was released as a digital download only on April 28, 2009.

Track list
1. Humble Peasants (16-bit version)

2. Compliance (16-bit version)

3. The Men Who Live Upstairs (16-bit version)

4. Present Of Future End (16-bit version)

5. Sherry And Her Butterfly Net (16-bit version)

References

2009 EPs
The Most Serene Republic albums
Arts & Crafts Productions EPs
2009 remix albums
Remix EPs